New Barag Left Banner (Mongolian:     Sin-e Barɣu Jegün qosiɣu) is a banner of Inner Mongolia, People's Republic of China, bordering Mongolia to the south. It is under the administration of Hulunbuir City.

Climate

References

www.xzqh.org 

Banners of Inner Mongolia
Hulunbuir